Cole  is a surname of English origin, and is also now used as a given name. It is of Middle English origin, and its meaning is "swarthy, coal-black, charcoal".

It is also an Americanized spelling of the German name "Kohl", of the Dutch name "Kool", and of the Scottish and Irish name "McCool".

People with the surname "Cole" include

A
A. Cole, English cricketer
Abner Cole (1783–1835), American newspaper editor
Abraham Cole (died 1890), American politician
Aaron Cole (born 1999), American hip-hop artist
Aaron Cole (basketball) (born 1973), Australian basketball player
Adam Cole (born 1989), American professional wrestler
Adam Cole (cricketer) (born 1974), English cricketer
Adrian Cole (disambiguation), multiple people
Aivale Cole, New Zealand soprano
A. J. Cole (born 1992), American baseball player
A. J. Cole III (born 1995), American football player
Al Cole (born 1964), American boxer
Albert Cole (disambiguation), multiple people
Alex Cole (born 1965), American baseball player
Alfred Cole (disambiguation), multiple people
Alhassan Cole (born 1955), Sierra Leonean politician
Allan Cole (born 1943), American author
Allan Cole (footballer) (born 1950), Jamaican footballer
Alphaeus Philemon Cole (1876–1988), American artist
Alyson Cole, American political scientist
Alyssa Cole (born 1982), American author
Andrea Cole, Canadian Paralympic swimmer
Andrew Cole (born 1971), English footballer
Andrew Cole (musician) (born 1982), Canadian musician
Andy Cole (born 1971), English footballer
Ann Cole (1934–1986), American singer
Anthony Cole (disambiguation), multiple people
Archie Cole (1900–1952), American baseball player
Arthur Cole (disambiguation), multiple people
Ashley Cole (born 1980), English footballer
Ashling Cole, American singer

B
Babette Cole (1950–2017), English writer
Barry Cole (1936–2014), English poet
Beccy Cole (born 1972), Australian singer-songwriter
Belle Cole (1853–1905), American contralto
Benjamin Cole (disambiguation), multiple people
Bert Cole (1896–1975), American baseball player
Bessie Olive Cole (1883–1971), American pharmacist
Bill Cole (disambiguation), multiple people
Billy Cole (born 1965), British athlete
Billy Cole (footballer) (1909–1958), Australian rules footballer
Bindi Cole (born 1975), Australian photographer
Bob Cole (disambiguation), multiple people
Bradley Cole (born 1959), American actor
Brendan Cole (born 1976), New Zealand ballroom dancer
Brendan Cole (sprinter) (born 1981), Australian hurdler
Brian Cole (disambiguation), multiple people
B. J. Cole (born 1946), English guitarist
Briony Cole (born 1983), Australian diver
Brock Cole (born 1938), American illustrator
Bruce Cole (1938–2018), American public policy analyst
Buddy Cole (musician) (1916–1964), American pianist

C
Cam Cole (born 1953), Canadian journalist
Carlton Cole (born 1983), English footballer
Carole Cole (1944–2009), American actress
Carolyn Cole (born 1961), American photographer
Carroll Cole (1938–1985), American serial killer
Casey Cole, American theologian
Catherine Cole (born 1950), Australian author and academic
Cecil Cole (1919–2002), American baseball player
Cecilia Cole (1920–2006), Gambian politician
Chanel Cole (born 1977), New Zealand musician
Charles Cole (disambiguation), multiple people
Charlie Cole (disambiguation), multiple people
Cheryl Cole (born 1983), English singer
Chester C. Cole (1824–1913), American judge
Chris Cole (disambiguation), multiple people
Christian Cole, Sierra Leonean football coach
Christian Cole (barrister) (1852–1885), Sierra Leonean barrister
Christina Cole (born 1982), English actress
Christopher Cole (disambiguation), multiple people
Clarence Alfred Cole (1909–1963), American bishop
Clay Cole (1938–2010), American disc jockey
Cody Cole (born 1990), New Zealand weightlifter
Colin Cole (disambiguation), multiple people
Cordelia Throop Cole (1833–1900), American social reformer
Corinne Cole (born 1937), American model
Corinne Alsop Cole (1886–1971), American politician
Cornelius Cole (1822–1924), American politician
Cozy Cole (1909–1981), American drummer
Craig Cole (born 1975), American football player
Cris Cole, British writer
C. Vernon Cole (1922–2013), American scientist
Cyrenus Cole (1863–1939), American politician and newspaper editor
Cyrus W. Cole (1876–1952), American naval officer

D
Daniel Cole (disambiguation), multiple people
Dandridge MacFarlan Cole (1921–1965), American aerospace engineer
Danton Cole (born 1967), American ice hockey player
Dave Cole (baseball) (1930–2011), American baseball player
Dave Cole (artist) (born 1975), American visual artist
David Cole (disambiguation), multiple people
Darrell S. Cole (1920–1945), American Marine
Darren Cole (born 1992), Scottish footballer
Dennis Cole (1940–2009), American actor
Deon Cole (born 1972), American comedian
Derham Cole (born 1977), American politician
Des Cole (1933–2015), Australian rules footballer
Desmond Cole (born 1982), Canadian journalist
Devin Cole (born 1976), American mixed martial artist
Donald Cole (disambiguation), multiple people
Doris Cole (born 1938), American architect
Doug Cole (1916–1959), English footballer
Douglas Cole (disambiguation), multiple people
Duncan Cole (born 1958), New Zealand footballer
Dylan Cole, American painter
Dylan Cole (American football) (born 1994), American football player

E
Earl Cole (born 1971), American entrepreneur
Ed Cole (1909–1977), American automotive executive
Ed Cole (baseball) (1909–1999), American baseball player
Eddie Cole (1910–1970), American musician
Eddie Cole (American football) (1919–2015), American football player and coach
Edith Cole (1870–1927), British actress
Edmund William Cole (1827–1899), American businessman
Edna Sarah Cole (1855–1950), American missionary
Edward Cole (disambiguation), multiple people
Edward Irham Cole (1857–1942), Australian theatrical entrepreneur and film director
Edwin Cole (disambiguation), multiple people
Elaine Cole, Canadian television personality
Eli K. Cole (1867–1929), American commanding officer
Ellie Cole (born 1991), Australian Paralympic swimmer
Elsie Vera Cole (1885–1967), English painter
Emerson Cole (1927–2019), American football player
Emma Cole (1845–1910), American teacher
Emmanuel Cole (1908–1972), Sierra Leonean soldier
Emory Cole (1893–1968), American lawyer
E. Nelson Cole (born 1937), American politician
Eric Cole (disambiguation), multiple people
Erik Cole (born 1978), American ice hockey player
Ernest Cole (disambiguation), multiple people
Eunice Cole (1590–1680), American witch
Evan Cole (born 1961), American entrepreneur
Evan Alex Cole (born 1985), American actor
Everett B. Cole (1910–2001), American writer
Ezra Danolds Cole (1902–1992), American stamp dealer

F
Fay-Cooper Cole (1881–1961), American anthropologist
Felix Cole (1887–1969), American diplomat
Femi Claudius Cole (born 1962), Sierra Leonean politician
Finn Cole (born 1995), English actor
Francis Cole (1872–1959), English zoologist
Frank Cole (disambiguation), multiple people
Fred Cole (disambiguation), multiple people
Freddy Cole (1931–2020), American musician
Frederick Cole (cricketer) (1852–1941), English cricketer
Fremont Cole (1856–1915), American politician

G
Gabriel Cole (disambiguation), multiple people
Galbraith Lowry Cole (1772–1842), British army officer
Galbraith Lowry Egerton Cole (1881–1929), Irish pioneer
Galen Cole (1925–2020), American philanthropist
Gardner Cole, American songwriter
Gary Cole (born 1956), American actor
Gary Cole (footballer) (born 1956), Australian footballer
G. D. H. Cole (1889–1959), English political theorist
G. Emerson Cole (1919–2002), American radio announcer
Gene Cole (1928–2018), American athlete
George Cole (disambiguation), multiple people
Gerrit Cole (born 1990), American baseball player
Gina Cole (born 1960), New Zealand writer
G. Marcus Cole, American law professor
Goody Cole (1590–1680), American witch
Gordon E. Cole (1833–1890), American lawyer and politician
Gracie Cole (1924–2006), English trumpeter
Graham Cole (born 1952), British actor
Grenville Cole (1859–1924), English geologist

H
Hal Cole (1912–1970), American race car driver
Hallam Cole (1874–1932), Barbadian cricketer
Harold Cole (1906–1946), British soldier
Harriette Cole (born 1961), American author
Harry Cole (disambiguation), multiple people
Hector Cole (1902–1981), New Zealand rugby league footballer
Helen Cole (1922–2004), American politician
Henri Cole (born 1956), American poet
Henry Cole (disambiguation), multiple people
Holly Cole (born 1963), Canadian singer
Horace de Vere Cole (1881–1936), British comedian
Howard Cole (disambiguation), multiple people
Hugh M. Cole (1911–2005), American army officer
Humfray Cole (1530–1591), English engraver
Hunter Cole (born 1971), American artist

I
Ian Cole (disambiguation), multiple people
Ike Cole (1927–2001), American pianist
Ingrid Cole, American actor
Irma Schoennauer Cole (1920–2003), American swimmer
Isaac Cole (1886–1940), English rugby league footballer
Israel Cole (born 1964), Sierra Leonean boxer

J
J. Cole (born 1985), American record artist
Jack Cole (disambiguation), multiple people
Jacqui Cole, British molecular engineer
Jade Cole (born 1979), American model
Jake Cole (born 1985), English footballer
James Cole (disambiguation), multiple people
Janelle Cole (born 1996), American cyclist
Kim Hunter (1922–2002), American actress, birth name Janet Cole
Janice Cole, American attorney
Janis Cole (born 1954), Canadian filmmaker
Jared Cole, Australian physicist
Jarred Cole (born 2000), English darts player
Jeffrey Cole, American anthropologist
Jennifer S. Cole, American linguistics professor
Jeremy Cole (born 1941), Zimbabwean sports shooter
Jerry Cole (1939–2008), American guitarist
Joanna Cole (disambiguation), multiple people
Joanne Cole (1934–1985), British artist
John Cole (disambiguation), multiple people
Johnnetta Cole (born 1936), American anthropologist
Johnnie Cole, American football player and coach
Jon Cole (disambiguation), multiple people
Jonathan Cole (disambiguation), multiple people
Joseph Cole (disambiguation), multiple people
Joshua Cole (disambiguation), multiple people
Juan Cole (born 1952), American historian
Jude Cole (born 1960), Canadian singer–songwriter
Julian Cole (1925–1999), American mathematician
Julie Dawn Cole (born 1957), British actress
June Cole (1903–1960), American bassist
Justin Cole (born 1987), American football player
J. W. Cole (1927–2014), American football coach

K
Kat Cole (born 1978), American businesswoman
Kate Cole (born 1978), Australian actress
Kate Cole (engineer), Australian engineer
Katherine Cole, American journalist
Katie Cole, Australian singer-songwriter
Keelan Cole (born 1993), American football player
Keith Cole (performance artist), Canadian performance artist
Kenneth Cole (disambiguation), multiple people
Kevin Cole (born 1960), American artist
Keyshia Cole (born 1981), American singer–songwriter
Kimberly Cole (born 1987), American singer-songwriter
King Cole (disambiguation), multiple people
Kresley Cole, American author
Kyla Cole (born 1978), Slovak model

L
Lanisha Cole (born 1982), American model
Larnell Cole (born 1993), English footballer
Larry Cole (born 1946), American football player
L. B. Cole (1918–1995), American comic book artist
L. C. Cole (born 1956), American football player
Leah Cole, American politician
Leon Cole (1939–2019), Canadian musician
Leon Jacob Cole (1877–1948), American ornithologist
Leonard A. Cole (born 1933), American political scientist
Leslie Cole (disambiguation), multiple people
Lester Cole (1904–1985), American screenwriter
Lilian Cole (born 1985), Nigerian footballer
Lily Cole (born 1988), English model
Lionel Cole, American pianist
Lior Cole (born 2001), American fashion model
Lincoln P. Cole (1918–1999), American politician
Linzy Cole (1948–2016), American football player
Lisa Cole (born 1973), American soccer coach
Liz Cole, English lawn bowler
Lloyd Cole (born 1961), English singer–songwriter
Lois Dwight Cole (1903–1979), American editor and author
Lori Ann Cole, American video game designer
Lorraine Cole (born 1967), English badminton player
Louis Cole (disambiguation), multiple people
Louise Cole (born 1974), Irish sailor
Lowry Cole (1772–1842), British army general
Lowry Cole, 4th Earl of Enniskillen (1845–1924), Irish politician
Luke Cole (1962–2009), American lawyer
Luke Cole (rugby union) (born 1993), English rugby union footballer
Luther Cole (disambiguation), multiple people
Lynnette Cole (born 1978), American model

M
Mabel Cook Cole (1880–1977), American dancer
Malcolm Cole (1949-1995), Aboriginal dancer and teacher at NAISDA Dance College, Sydney
Marcus Cole (musician) (born 1971), American musician
Margaret Cole (1893–1980), English novelist and politician
Margie Cole, American bridge player
Marguerite Cole (1897–1987), American volunteer
Maria Cole (1922–2012), American singer
Marion Cole (1924–2011), American pilot
Marjorie Kowalski Cole (1953–2009), American poet
Mark Cole, member of the Virginia House of Delegates
Martin Cole (disambiguation), multiple people
Martina Cole (born 1959), English novelist
Marverine Cole, British television presenter
Marvin Frederick Cole (1922–2005), American judge
Mason Cole (born 1996), American football player
Matt Cole (born 1996), American football player
Maurice Cole (cricketer) (1901–1971), South African cricketer
Maurice Cole (pianist) (1902–1990), English pianist
Max Cole (born 1937), American filmmaker
Max Cole (footballer) (1941–2018), Australian rules footballer
Mel D. Cole (born 1976), American photographer
Melanie Cole (born 1968), Canadian ice dancer
Michael Cole (disambiguation), multiple people
Michal Cole (born 1974), Israeli artist
Mitch Cole, American basketball coach
Mitchell Cole (1985–2012), English footballer
M. J. Cole (born 1973), British musician
Monica Cole (1922–1994), English geographer
Myke Cole (born 1973), American author
Myrtle Cole (born 1966), American politician

N
Nancy Cole, American psychologist
Nancy Cole (mathematician) (1902–1991), American mathematician
Nat King Cole (1917–1965), American singer and pianist
Natalie Cole (1950–2015), American singer
Natalie Robinson Cole (1901–1984), American educator and author
Nathan Cole (1825–1904), American politician
Nathan Cole Jr. (1860–1921), American newspaper founder
Ned Cole (1917–2002), American bishop
Neil Cole (disambiguation), multiple people
Neville Cole (1952–2009), Irish boxer
Nicholas Cole (disambiguation), multiple people
Nick Cole (born 1984), American football player
Nigel Cole (born 1959), English film director
Norma Cole (born 1945), Canadian poet
Norman Cole (disambiguation), multiple people
Norris Cole (born 1988), American basketball player

O
Olivia Cole (1942–2018), American actress
Olivia Cole (poet) (born 1981), British poet
Orlando Cole (1908–2010), American cellist
Orsamus Cole (1819–1903), American lawyer and judge

P
Pam Cole (born 1967), American graphic designer and politician
Patrick Cole (born 1993), American basketball player
Paul Cole (born 1941), British racehorse trainer
Paula Cole (born 1968), American singer–songwriter
Pete Cole (1916–1971), American football player
Peter Cole (disambiguation), multiple people
Philip Cole, American pharmacologist
Pinky Cole (born 1987), Jamaican-American restaurateur
Phoebe Cole (1955–2017), American artist
Preston Cole, American politician

R
Ralph Cole (disambiguation), multiple people
Randall Cole, Canadian film director
Raquel Cole (born 1993), Canadian singer
R. Beverly Cole (1829–1901), American physician
R. Clint Cole (1870–1957), American politician
Rebecca Cole (disambiguation), multiple people
Rebel A. Cole (born 1958), American finance professor
Reece Cole (born 1998), English footballer
Reginald Berkeley Cole (1882–1925), British colonist
Reggie Cole, West Indian cricket umpire
Renee Cole (born 1971), American beauty pageant contestant
Rex Vicat Cole (1870–1940), British artist
R. Guy Cole Jr. (born 1951), American judge
Richard Cole (disambiguation), multiple people
Rick Cole (born 1953), American politician
R. J. Cole (born 1999), American basketball player
Robert Cole (disambiguation), multiple people
Robin Cole (born 1955), American football player
Roger Cole, Irish politician
Ron Cole, American domestic terrorist
Rowena Cole (born 1992), British runner
Roy Cole (1932–2012), American type designer
Roy Cole (sport shooter) (1912–1999), Canadian sport shooter

S
Sadie Chandler Cole (1865–1941), American singer
Sally Cottrell Cole (1800–1875), American enslaved maid
Samantha Cole (born 1978), American singer
Samuel Cole (disambiguation), multiple people
Sandy Cole (born 1953), American politician
Sarah Cole (1805–1857), American painter
Shannon Cole (born 1984), Australian footballer
Shaun Cole (born 1963), British cosmologist
Shelly Cole (born 1975), American actress
Sheryl Cole (born 1964), American politician
Shirley Bell Cole (1920–2010), American actress
Sidney Cole (1908–1998), British film producer
Simon Cole (born 1958), British media executive
Slim Cole (1892–??), American stuntman
Soji Cole, Nigerian playwright
Sonia Nassery Cole (born 1965), Afghani-American activist
Stacey Cole (born 1982), English volleyball player
Stanley Cole (disambiguation), multiple people
Stephanie Cole (born 1941), English actress
Stephen Cole (disambiguation), multiple people
Steve Cole (born 1970), American saxophonist
Steven Cole (born 1982), British actor
Steven Cole (tenor) (born 1949), American opera singer
Stewart Cole (born 1965), British/French microbiologist
Stranger Cole (born 1942), Jamaican singer
Stu Cole (born 1966), American baseball player
Susan Cole (disambiguation), multiple people
Susanna Cole (1633–1713), American colonist
Syn Cole (born 1988), Estonian disc jockey

T
Tammy Cole (born 1973), Australian field hockey player
Taylor Cole (born 1984), American actress
Taylor Cole (baseball) (born 1989), American baseball player
Teju Cole (born 1975), Nigerian-American writer
Tennyson Cole (1862–1939), English painter
Terence Cole (disambiguation), multiple people
Theodore Cole (disambiguation), multiple people
Thomas Cole (disambiguation), multiple people
Tiffany Cole (born 1981), American murderer
Tim Cole (1960–1999), American wrongfully convicted man
Timothy Cole (1852–1931), American engraver
Tina Cole (born 1943), American actress
T. N. Cole (1844–1924), Australian umpire
Tobias Cole (born 1971), Australian countertenor
Tommy Cole (born 1941), American make-up artist
Tony Cole (born 1947), Australian public servant
Tonye Cole (born 1967), Nigerian businessman
Tosin Cole (born 1992), American-British actor
Trent Cole (born 1982), American football player
Trevor Cole (disambiguation), multiple people
Tristan de Vere Cole (born 1935), English television director
Triston Cole (born 1976), American politician
Troy Cole (born 1986), American soccer player
Tyson Cole (born 1970), American chef

U
Ulric Cole (1905–1992), American pianist

V
Vernon Cole (1938–1972), American football player
Victor Cole (born 1968), Russian baseball player
Vinson Cole (born 1950), American tenor
Virginia Cole (1947–2018), Irish actress

W
Walter Cole, American politician
Walter L. Cole (1???–1943), Irish merchant and politician
Warren Cole (disambiguation), multiple people
Wertha Pendleton Cole (1891–1959), American academic administrator
Whitefoord Russell Cole (1874–1934), American businessman
William Cole (disambiguation), multiple people
Willie Cole (born 1955), American sculptor
Willis Cole (1882–1965), American baseball player
Willis Vernon Cole (1882–1939), American poet
W. Sterling Cole (1904–1987), American politician

Z
Zena Cole, American Paralympic discus thrower
Zeralda Elizabeth Cole (1825–1911), American woman

Fictional characters
Augustus Cole, a fictional character in the video game Gears of War
Buddy Cole, Canadian television character in The Kids in the Hall
King Cole, figure in British literature and legend since the Middle Ages (possible basis for the nursery rhyme Old King Cole)
Norris Cole, a character in the soap opera Coronation Street
Rust Cohle, a television character in True Detective

See also
Cole (disambiguation), a disambiguation page for Cole
Cole (given name), people with the given name "Cole"
Coles (surname), people with the surname "Coles"
Coe (surname), people with the surname "Coe"
Kole (name), people with the given name "Kole"
General Cole (disambiguation), a disambiguation page for Generals surnamed "Cole"
Justice Cole (disambiguation), a disambiguation page for Justices surnamed "Cole"
Senator Cole (disambiguation), a disambiguation page for Senators surnamed "Cole"

References

English-language surnames
Surnames of English origin